Plant variety is a legal term, following the International Union for the Protection of New Varieties of Plants (UPOV) Convention. Recognition of a cultivated plant (a cultivar) as a "variety" in this particular sense provides its breeder with some legal protection, so-called plant breeders' rights, depending to some extent on the internal legislation of the UPOV signatory countries, such as the Plant Variety Protection Act in the US.

This "variety" (which will differ in status according to national law) should not be confused with the international
taxonomic rank of "variety" (regulated by the International Code of Nomenclature for algae, fungi, and plants), nor with the term "cultivar" (regulated by the International Code of Nomenclature for Cultivated Plants).  Some horticulturists use "variety" imprecisely; for example, viticulturists almost always refer to grape cultivars as "grape varieties".

See also 
 Community Plant Variety Office of the European Union
 Lists of cultivars
 Protection of Plant Varieties and Farmers' Rights Act, 2001 of India

External links 
 International Union for the Protection of New Varieties of Plants (UPOV)
 Community Plant Variety Office (CPVO)

Legal terminology
Biological patent law
Agricultural law